Howmeh Rural District is a rural district (dehestan) in the Central District of Garmsar County, Semnan Province, Iran. At the 2006 census, its population was 3,285, in 918 families.  The rural district has 24 villages.

References 

Rural Districts of Semnan Province
Garmsar County